The Concord grape is a cultivar derived from the grape species Vitis labrusca (also known as fox grape) that are used as table grapes, wine grapes and juice grapes. They are often used to make grape jelly, grape juice, grape pies, grape-flavored soft drinks, and candy. The grape is sometimes used to make wine, particularly sacramental and kosher wine. Traditionally, most commercially produced Concord wines have been finished sweet, but dry versions are possible if adequate fruit ripeness is achieved. The grape is named after the town in Massachusetts where it was developed.

The skin of a Concord grape is typically dark blue or purple and often is covered with a glaucous epicuticular wax "bloom" that can be rubbed off. It is a slip-skin variety, meaning the skin is easily separated from the fruit.  Concord grapes have large seeds and are highly aromatic. The Concord grape is particularly prone to the physiological disorder black spot.

In the United States, 417,800 tons were produced in 2011. The major growing areas are the Finger Lakes District of New York, Lake Erie, Lake Ontario, Southwestern Michigan, and the Yakima Valley in Washington. They are sometimes found growing wild.

Usage
Concord grapes are often used to make grape jelly and are only occasionally available as table grapes, especially in New England. They are the usual grapes used in the jelly for the traditional peanut butter and jelly sandwich, and Concord grape jelly is a staple product in U.S. supermarkets. Concord grapes are used for grape juice, and their distinctive purple color has led to grape-flavored soft drinks and candy being artificially colored purple. Methyl anthranilate, a chemical present in Concord grapes, is used to give "grape" flavor.  The dark-colored Concord juice is used in some churches as a non-alcoholic alternative to wine in the service of communion.  Concord grapes have been used to make kosher wine and sacramental wine. The oldest sacramental winery in America, O-Neh-Da Vineyard, still produces a Concord wine for the altar. Non-toxic sprays that contain methyl anthranilate can be sprayed on the bushes as a cost-effective bird control management.  The spray repellent renders the fruit and foliage unpalatable to the birds.

History

The Concord grape was developed in 1849 by Ephraim Wales Bull in Concord, Massachusetts. Bull planted seeds from wild Vitis labrusca and evaluated over 22,000 seedlings before finding what he considered the ideal Concord grape.  Genetic testing confirmed that Concord grape has roughly one-third Vitis vinifera parentage. The selected Concord vine was planted next to other cultivars, including Catawba, which was later confirmed to be a parent of Concord using stematic SSR analysis.

In 1853, Bull's grape won first place at the Boston Horticultural Society Exhibition.  It was then introduced to the market in 1854. Dr. Thomas Bramwell Welch developed the first Concord grape juice in his house in 1869. Through the process of pasteurization, the juice did not ferment. Welch transferred the juice operations to Westfield, New York, processing 300 tons of grapes into juice in 1897.

Gallery

See also
 Muscadine
 Scuppernong

References

External links

 Concord Grape Association
 National Grape Cooperative

Concord, Massachusetts
Table grape varieties
Red wine grape varieties
Hybrid grape varieties